Cochran is a surname of Scottish (and most likely of Cumbric) origin. The earliest known appearance is in Dumbartonshire (14th cent). The definition is unclear, however the name may be derived from the extinct Cumbric language, which is closely related to the Welsh language. At the time of the British census of 1881, its relative frequency was highest in Renfrewshire (34.3 times the British average), followed by Wigtownshire, Ayrshire, Dunbartonshire, Lanarkshire, Buteshire, Stirlingshire, Argyll, Kirkcudbrightshire and Forfarshire. The Cochrans are traditionally mainly a Western Lowlands family. 

Notable people with the surname include:

Alexander Gilmore Cochran (1846–1928), US Congressman from Pennsylvania
Alexander Smith Cochran (1874–1929), American businessman and philanthropist
Anita Cochran, American singer-songwriter
Anne Cochran, American singer
Barbara Cochran (born 1951), American Olympic gold medal skier
Bert Cochran (1913–1984), American Communist politician and writer
Charles B. Cochran (1873–1951), English stage actor and theatrical manager
Dale M. Cochran (1928–2018), American farmer and politician
Denny Cochran (1915–1992), American football player
Dorcas Cochran (c. 1903–1991), American lyricist and screenwriter
Doris Mable Cochran (1898–1968), American zoologist
Eddie Cochran (1938–1960), American rock and roll singer-songwriter and guitarist
Gregory Cochran (born 1953), American professor at the University of Utah
Hank Cochran (1935–2010), American country music singer and songwriter  
Jacob Cochran (1782–1836), "spiritual wifery" cult leader in Saco, Maine
Jacqueline Cochran (1906–1980), American aviator
John Cochran (disambiguation), multiple people
 Johnnie Cochran (1937–2005), American attorney
 Joseph Gallup Cochran (1817–1871), American missionary and translator in Iran
Joseph Plumb Cochran (1855–1905), American missionary and doctor in Iran
Julian Cochran (born 1974), Australian composer 
Leslie Cochran (1951–2012), American homeless man and activist
Neil Cochran (born 1965), Scottish swimmer
Philip Cochran (1910–1979), U.S. Army Air Forces colonel and inspiration for characters in the comic strips, Terry and the Pirates and Steve Canyon
Ron Cochran (1912–1994), American television news journalist
Robert Cochran (disambiguation), several people
Russ Cochran (born 1958), American golfer
Samuel Cochran (1871–1952), American medical missionary
Stephen Cochran (born 1979), American country music singer and songwriter
Thomas C. Cochran (1877–1935), US Congressman from Pennsylvania
Thad Cochran (1937–2019), American politician
Wayne Cochran (1939–2017), American singer
William Gemmell Cochran (1909–1980), British statistician working in the United States, the person Cochran's theorem, Cochran's C test, Cochran's Q test and Cochran’s sample size formula were named for

Notes

Scottish toponymic surnames